The Bolivia national tennis team represents Bolivia in Davis Cup tennis competition and are governed by the Federación Boliviana de Tenis.

Bolivia currently compete in the Americas Zone of Group II.  They have reached Group II on eight occasions.

History
Bolivia competed in its first Davis Cup in 1971.

Current team (2022)

 Murkel Dellien
 Federico Zeballos
 Juan Carlos Prado (Junior player)
 Boris Arias

See also
Davis Cup
Bolivia Fed Cup team

References

External links

Davis Cup teams
Davis Cup
Davis Cup
1971 establishments in Bolivia
Sports clubs established in 1971